Phyllonorycter zelkovae is a moth of the family Gracillariidae. It is known from the islands of Honshu and Kyushu in Japan.

The wingspan is 6–7 mm.

The larvae feed as leaf miners on Zelkova serrata. The mine is ptychonomous and created on the lower surface of the leaves.

References

zelkovae
Moths of Japan

Moths described in 1963
Taxa named by Tosio Kumata
Leaf miners